The Chicago, Rock Island and Pacific Railroad: Stuart Passenger Station is a historic building located in Stuart, Iowa, United States. The town of Stuart was laid out by Charles A. Stuart, for whom it is named, in concert with the Chicago, Rock Island and Pacific Railroad.  The railroad reached this point in 1868 and the depot was completed the following year.  It is a single story, side gable, frame structure covered with brick veneer.  The segmentally-arched widows are capped with brick hoods and limestone keystones.  It contains four rooms that housed a baggage room, men's waiting room, ticket office, and the ladies waiting room.  This was one of several buildings constructed in Stuart by the Rock Island Line, which placed a divisional headquarters here from the beginning.  Other facilities included a roundhouse (1871) and brick shops (1874) that replaced wood-frame structures.  In 1897 the railroad moved its facilities to Valley Junction, now West Des Moines.  

The station last had passenger service in 1965. In its final years it served only as a limited service stop station between Atlantic to the west and Des Moines to the east, on a local train between Omaha and Chicago.

The depot, which was abandoned by the railroad in 1977, is the only structure that remains in Stuart from its heyday as a railroad town.  It was listed on the National Register of Historic Places in 1980.

References

Railway stations in the United States opened in 1869
Railway stations closed in 1977
Former railway stations in Iowa
Transportation buildings and structures in Adair County, Iowa
National Register of Historic Places in Adair County, Iowa
Railway stations on the National Register of Historic Places in Iowa
Stuart
1869 establishments in Iowa